Margaret Smith defeated the defending champion Maria Bueno in the final, 6–4, 7–5 to win the ladies' singles tennis title at the 1965 Wimbledon Championships. For the first time in the history of seeding in the championships, there was no British player seeded in the draw.

Seeds

  Maria Bueno (final)
  Margaret Smith (champion)
  Lesley Turner (quarterfinals)
  Nancy Richey (quarterfinals)
  Billie Jean Moffitt (semifinals)
  Carole Graebner (second round)
  Annette Van Zyl (withdrew)
  Françoise Dürr (fourth round)

Annette Van Zyl withdrew due to a family bereavement. She was replaced in the draw by lucky loser Michelle Boulle.

Draw

Finals

Top half

Section 1

Section 2

Section 3

Section 4

Bottom half

Section 5

Section 6

Section 7

Section 8

References

External links

Women's Singles
Wimbledon Championship by year – Women's singles
Wimbledon Championships
Wimbledon Championships